Agustín Rodríguez Fuentes (28 August 1950 – 22 February 2022) was a Mexican politician affiliated with the Party of the Democratic Revolution. He served as Deputy of the LIX Legislature of the Mexican Congress representing the Federal District.

Fuentes died from Covid-19 in 2022.

References

1950 births
2022 deaths
People from Oaxaca City
Party of the Democratic Revolution politicians
Deaths from the COVID-19 pandemic in Mexico
Deputies of the LIX Legislature of Mexico
Members of the Chamber of Deputies (Mexico) for Mexico City